The ISEPIC from Starpoint Software in USA is an extension cartridge which was introduced in June 1985 for the Commodore 64. It offers the capability to memory dump software regardless of the implementation scheme or storage medium. The resulting snapshot can be tested before saving.

Snapshots require ISEPIC to run. The cartridge vanished at the end of 1985 but still sold 20,000 units around the world, mostly by word of mouth at local computer clubs and niche magazines.

A major factor is the 2 kB RAM that could be reprogrammed And thus allowed the user to change its functionality. The 2 kB RAM is memory banked into a 256-byte page at 0xDF00 – 0xDFFF.

Reception
Ahoy! in October 1985 stated that "the ramifications of [ISEPIC] are startling, to say the least". While warning readers against violating copyright, the magazine discussed the cartridge's ability to both produce snapshots that required the cartridge to boot, and help users modify snapshots to produce standalone versions of programs ("In the tradition of the true hacker, these routines also display the Isepic logo while booting the program"). In a review of two other memory dumpers in March 1986, the magazine stated that they were superior: "While ISEPIC did not do bad as a forerunner, it does not measure up to the products reviewed here" which, among other improvements, produced standalone snapshots.

See also
 Trilogic Expert Cartridge - A later cartridge with 8 kB RAM

References

External links 
 c64.org - ISEPIC

Home computer peripherals
Commodore 64